Nyctibatrachus aliciae (Alicia's night frog or Alice's night frog) is a species of frogs in the family Nyctibatrachidae endemic to the southern Western Ghats in Ponmudi and Athirimala in Kerala, India. These frogs occur in riparian habitats and in streams in tropical moist evergreen and semi-evergreen forests, tolerating some degree of habitat modification. The species, though locally common, has a small distribution are and is threatened by habitat loss.

References

Nyctibatrachus
Frogs of India
Endemic fauna of the Western Ghats
Amphibians described in 1984
Taxonomy articles created by Polbot